Padarqışlaq (also, Padar) is a village and municipality in the Agsu Rayon of Azerbaijan.  It has a population of 1,247.

References 

Populated places in Agsu District